ʿUrwa ibn al-Zubayr ibn al-ʿAwwām al-Asadī was an early Muslim traditionist and a founding figure in the field of historical study among the Muslims. He was a son of Muhammad's close aide Zubayr ibn al-Awwam, and a nephew of his wife A'isha. He spent much of his life in Medina, witnessed the First Muslim Civil War (656–661) as a youth, and supported his elder brother Abd Allah ibn al-Zubayr in his failed attempt to establish his caliphate in the Second Muslim Civil War (680–692). After Abd Allah's elimination by his Umayyad rivals, Urwa reconciled with the Umayyads, whom he paid occasional visits and maintained a literary correspondence with.

Urwa's relations with important early Islamic figures gave him access to first hand accounts on the early Islamic period, which he collected from his father, his aunt, and a number of companions of Muhammad, passing these on to his students, above all Ibn Shihab al-Zuhri and his son Hisham. A large number of these traditions are reported in the hadith and historical literature. Some of his literary correspondences with the Umayyad caliphs Abd al-Malik ibn Marwan and al-Walid I have also been reported in historical works. Combined, they cover almost all important events of Muhammad's prophetic career as well as early caliphate, and are central to the historical study of Muhammad. Modern historians have debated the authenticity of the Urwa corpus of traditions. Some hold that most of the traditions reported on his authority did indeed originate with him and the core of the information contained therein is genuine, although they have been modified and colored by later transmitters to some extent. On the other hand, some hold that much of the corpus is later, retrospective attribution to Urwa.

Biography
Sources differ on Urwa's birth year, placing it in 22, 23, 26, or 29 AH. 23 AH, corresponding to 643/644 CE, is most likely. His father was Zubayr ibn al-Awwam, a senior companion of the Islamic prophet Muhammad, and his mother was Asma, a daughter of the first caliph Abu Bakr and sister of Muhammad's wife A'isha. Abd Allah ibn al-Zubayr, the counter-caliph of the Second Muslim Civil War, was his full brother.

Urwa spent his early life in Medina during the caliphate of the third caliph Uthman. After Uthman's assassination, he accompanied his father, brother, and his aunt A'isha to the southern Iraqi town of Basra, where the three elders fought against the fourth caliph Ali. Urwa was not allowed to participate in the fight due to his young age. His father was killed in the battle and he returned to Medina with his aunt. His father's considerable fortune enabled Urwa to concentrate on studies and he began collecting and studying reports on the earlier period of Islam. His main informant was A'isha. It is unclear exactly when he started the activity, but he is reported to have held regular sessions of study with his friends in the mosque of Medina during the later years of the reign of Mu'awiya I, the first caliph of the Umayyad caliphate, which succeeded the earlier Medina-based Rashidun caliphate after the First Muslim Civil War (656–661). The group included among others, his half-brother Mus'ab and the future caliph Abd al-Malik ibn Marwan. Arab historian al-Baladhuri (d. 892) narrates a report from Urwa that he spent seven years in Egypt, which according to the historian Joseph Horovitz would fall between 678 and 685, and married there. The historian Gregor Schoeler considers it unlikely that he spent seven continuous years in Egypt.

In the Second Muslim Civil War (680–692), his elder brother Abd Allah established his counter-caliphate in opposition to the Umayyads, and Urwa supported him. When the Umayyad general al-Hajjaj ibn Yusuf besieged Mecca in 692 to overthrow Abd Allah, Urwa is reported to have negotiated Abd Allah's surrender with al-Hajjaj, who agreed to grant him safety. Abd Allah ultimately decided to die fighting, whose body al-Hajjaj struck on a cross. Urwa escaped al-Hajjaj to Medina, where he deposited the wealth of the Zubayrid family, and then rode to Caliph Abd al-Malik in Damascus, the capital of the Umayyads, informing him of Abd Allah's death even before al-Hajjaj's messenger could reach him. The Caliph treated him with respect and granted his request to retrieve Abd Allah's body. He returned to Mecca to burry him and offered funeral prayers over him. The sources do not mention any further Damascus visits by Urwa in Abd al-Malik's time, but the two maintained correspondence through letters, as Abd Al-Malik would consult him on the events of early Islamic period.

Urwa now settled in Medina and continued his scholarly activity. After Abd al-Malik's death in 705, Urwa traveled to Damascus to give his allegiance to the new caliph al-Walid I. During this stay, his son Muhammad died in an accident, while Urwa himself suffered from gangrene in one of his feet, which had to be amputated. The council was tasked to advise the governor on legal matters. Urwa died on his estate near Rabadha, which lay 200 km east of Medina, and was buried there. The year of his death is given variously between 93 AH and 101 AH, the most likely being 94 AH, which corresponds to 712/713 CE.

The sources describe him as a person with upright character who avoided discord and lived a pious life. He is regarded as one of the seven  (jurists) of Medina. In the view of Joseph Schacht, however, none of them held to the legal doctrines of the Medinan school since the doctrines developed only later and were ascribed to them in retrospect. Urwa is reported to have written books on law, but these have not survived. According to a report by his son Hisham (d. 763/764), Urwa destroyed them on the day of the Battle of al-Harra (August 683), when the army of the second Umayyad caliph Yazid I stormed Medina to quell the rebellion there. The books of early scholars were written for private use and they would destroy them before their deaths out of fear that they might fall into others' hands and compete with the Qur'an. Urwa destroyed the books anticipating his death in the battle. He later used to express deep regret for this loss.

Transmission of historical material
Urwa serves as a source for two types of materials on the early Islamic period: hadith and letters. His situation in an important early Islamic family enabled him to obtain first hand information on the period. He would gather accounts from his father, mother, as well as his aunt, but has also reported from other authorities such as Abd Allah ibn Abbas, Abu Hurayra, Abd Allah ibn Amr ibn al-As, Usama ibn Zayd, and Abu Dharr al-Ghifari.

Hadith
Urwa narrated a number of hadiths (traditions about the sayings and deeds attributed to Muhammad as well as early Muslims) which are transmitted through his son Hisham and his student Ibn Shihab al-Zuhri (d. 742). These have been reported in hadith collections—Musnad of Ibn Hanbal (d. 855), and the canonical compilations of al-Bukhari (d. 870) and Muslim (d. 875) among others—legal works like Muwatta of Malik ibn Anas (d. 795), historical works (Ibn Ishaq, al-Tabari, al-Baladhuri), and the exegetical works (e.g. Tafsir al-Tabari). The hadiths cover all events of significance on early Islam, but his reports concerning the life of Muhammad are of central importance. According to Schoeler, these are taken as the starting point for any historical study of Muhammad's life. They include subjects like the beginning of Muhammad's prophecy, Meccan persecution, hijra to Medina, campaigns against the Jewish tribes of Qaynuqa and Qurayza, the battles of the Trench and Hunayn, the treaty of Hudaybiyya, Muhammad's letters to various people, as well as his last days. He also narrated short reports on the Rashidun period such as the Ridda wars, campaigns in Syria, the claims of Abbas, Fatima, and Muhammad's wives to his inheritance, battles of Yarmuk, Qadisiyya, and Camel, and Umar's journey to Jerusalem. However, some of these are no more than passing references.

In addition to historical data, he transmitted hadiths on legal issues concerning laws (such as those on property, marriage, divorce, the status of women and slaves) and rituals, such as ablution, prayer, and pilgrimage. Many of his transmitted hadiths give explanations for various Qur'anic passages and provide historical background to their origin. This would later become a standard practice in Qur'anic exegesis to explain verses in terms of Muhammad's life.

In the traditional Muslim hadith criticism, Urwa is considered a trustworthy transmitter and is praised for his piety and depth of his knowledge. In some of his hadith narrations, Urwa did not specify the authorities from whom he got these traditions, whereas in others, his  do not fulfil the requirements of  criticism as they developed later on. Two-thirds of his hadiths are transmitted on the authority of A'isha, although in some of these  her name might have been inserted later. In some reports, his sources are written documents.

Written sources

Urwa's letters to the Caliphs Abd al-Malik and al-Walid, which he wrote in response to their queries, have been reported to the fullest in the History and the Tafsir of al-Tabari (d. 923), although to a lesser extent also in earlier works of Ibn Ishaq (d. 767), al-Waqidi (d. 823), Ibn Sa'd (d. 844/845), Ibn Hanbal, and Umar ibn Shabba (d. 875), which contain excerpts and references to these letters. They have not survived in the documentary form nor has their exact wording been preserved due to the process of oral transmission. Nine letters in total have been reported through three different chains of transmission from Hisham, al-Zuhri, and Abu al-Zinad, a mawla (freedman) of the family of Caliph Uthman. However, not all are transmitted through each of these , and some only appear in al-Tabari's works.

The letters contain accounts of the Meccan persecution, hijra to Abyssinia (Ethiopian Empire) and Medina, the battles of Badr and Hunayn, treaty of Hudayniyya, conquest of Mecca, and calumniation of A'isha. According to Horovitz and Fuat Sezgin, these materials form the oldest surviving written records on the life of Muhammad and the oldest Arabic historical prose. In most of his letters, Urwa does not name his sources. In Horovitz's opinion, they undoubtedly come from the traditions he collected.

Later authors attribute to Urwa a book on the military campaigns of Muhammad. It is unlikely that he actually wrote a book. He did write down some of the hadiths he transmitted, but these were written mainly for topically arranging his hadith lectures and not as a book. Fred Donner states that since the later sources attribute written books to Urwa and no earlier authorities, it seems to imply that he was the first to systematically collect and write down individual traditions.

Authenticity

The authenticity of the traditions transmitted by Urwa concerns two questions. First, whether the vast number of traditions attributed to him can actually be traced back to him. Second, whether the material reported by him is indeed authentic. According to Andreas Goerke and Schoeler, the majority of the hadiths attributed to him do go back to Urwa, although some appear to be spurious. The textual analysis of the traditions transmitted by both Hisham and al-Zuhri, which differ considerably in wording and detail but share the same overall structure, reveals that most of them were indeed transmitted independently of each other and come from the same source (i.e. Urwa). On the reliability of information that indeed goes back to him, Schoeler states that it is possible that some of the information he received from his authorities was distorted due to bias and memory lapse, but it is unlikely that any of that material was invented or distorted beyond recognition. Nor is it likely that the reports were distorted by Urwa himself. The information on Muhammad's life, at least for the Medinan period, as derived from Urwa, is thus largely reliable. 

Analyzing the Hudaybiyya traditions attributed to Urwa, Goerke concluded that his version is the oldest of all, and has been redacted over the long transmission process. In the first step, Urwa himself combined various eyewitness reports available to him, not all of which necessarily belonged to the same event. He orally transmitted that synthesized version to Hisham and al-Zuhri, who in turn transmitted it independently of each other. The original core of the tradition going back to Urwa likely consisted of three points: a treaty between Muhammad and the Quraysh; a clause requiring extradition back to Mecca of any Meccan fugitives to Medina; and actual extradition of certain individuals. Al-Zuhri's version was committed to writing significantly later than Hisham's and suffered alterations during transmission. Similarly, Goerke and Schoeler concluded that the core of the hijra traditions—the harassment of the Muslims in Mecca, hijra to Abyssinia, general hijra to Medina followed by Muhammad and Abu Bakr's journey to the city—indeed goes back to Urwa. The specific details may or may not be from Urwa himself.

Stephen Shoemaker has contested the conclusions of Goerke and Schoeler, arguing that only for a few elements of these traditions can a secure connection with Urwa be established, with a majority of them going back to al-Zuhri at most. He suspects that Urwa's reputation as an authority on Muhammad's life might have resulted in attribution to him of many traditions that were previously unassigned to any authority. He also doubts the authenticity of the letter attributed to Urwa concerning the hijra, stating that it is only reported by al-Tabari and he almost certainly did not have access to the document itself but got the contents through oral transmission. The letter might well be spurious. According to Sean Anthony, the internal features of the most of these letters imply they are largely authentic. They are consistent with the image of the Umayyads and Zubayrids that emerges from other sources, are lacking any hagiographic and miraculous stories, and fit well in the context of Umayyad-Zubayrid reconciliation. The lack of any mention of the Ali in these letters, whom these both families were at odds with, adds further weight to their authenticity. Schoeler, likewise, regards them as authentic, allowing for the possibility of changes in the course of transmission.

Based on the accounts that are narrated on his authority in the works of Ibn Ishaq and others, Alfred Guillaume calls him the "founder of Islamic history", whereas Schoeler considers his letters "the beginning of Islamic historiography". To Abd al-Aziz Duri, Urwa laid the foundation of historical study that was then taken up by later generations. To Chase F. Robinson on the contrary, he was a story-teller who "took some interest in the past" and perhaps taught about it, but not really a historian.

Notes

References

Sources

 

 

 

 

 

 

 

 

 

 

 

 

 

 

 

 

 

 

713 deaths
7th-century Arabs
8th-century Arabs
8th-century historians of the medieval Islamic world
8th-century jurists
Abu Bakr family
Banu Asad (Quraysh)
Scholars from the Umayyad Caliphate
Sunni imams
Tabi‘un hadith narrators
Year of birth unknown